This is a list of Brazilian films of the 2000s. For a complete alphabetical list, see :Category:Brazilian films.

2000
 List of Brazilian films of 2000

2001
 List of Brazilian films of 2001

2002
 List of Brazilian films of 2002

2003
 List of Brazilian films of 2003

2004
 List of Brazilian films of 2004

2005
 List of Brazilian films of 2005

2006
 List of Brazilian films of 2006

2007
 List of Brazilian films of 2007

2008
 List of Brazilian films of 2008

2009
 List of Brazilian films of 2009

External links
 Brazilian film at the Internet Movie Database

Brazilian
Films